Gabriel  Bonsdorff (1762 in Borga – 1831) was a Finnish entomologist who specialised  in Coleoptera notably Curculionidae.

Works
partial list
1785 with Laurentius G Borgström and Petrus Ant Norlin Historia naturalis curculionum Sveciae : cujus partem primam [-secundam], consent. experient. Facult. Med. examini offerunt.Upsaliae : Apud Johan Edman ..., [1785]

References
Walther Horn & Sigmund Schenkling: Index Litteraturae Entomologicae. Serie I: Die Welt-Literatur über die gesamte Entomologie bis inklusive 1863. Berlin 1928.

Finnish entomologists
Gabriel
1831 deaths
1762 births